Sélestat station (French: Gare de Sélestat) is a railway station serving the commune of Sélestat, Bas-Rhin department, France. It is located at the junction of the Strasbourg–Basel railway with the branch lines towards Molsheim and Lièpvre. The station is owned and operated by SNCF, in the TER Grand Est regional rail network and is served by TER trains.

References 

Railway stations in Bas-Rhin
Railway stations in France opened in 1840